Uncle Haathi and his Friends — Creepy the Mischief Maker is an animated children's television show in India. The show was introduced in North America as a selection to the 2008 Dawn Breakers International Film Festival in Arizona, United States.

Director: Shayam Lal
Writer/Producer: Elham Mohajer
Animators: Shyam Lal, R. K. Sudarshan, Anurag Singh, Devendra Singh, Abhishek Sing, Vineet Satulay

External links
Dawn Breaker festival listing
Indian Express article

Indian children's animated television series
Animated television series about elephants
Animated television series about mammals
Animated television series about animals
Indian children's animated adventure television series
Indian children's animated comedy television series
Elephants in India